Jeffrey Allen Cross (born  May 25, 1966) is a former American football defensive end in the National Football League. He was drafted by the Miami Dolphins in the ninth round of the 1988 NFL Draft. He played college football at Missouri.

Cross was a Pro Bowl selection in 1990.

On April 19, 2018, Cross signed a one-day contract to retire as a member of the Dolphins.

References

1966 births
Living people
Players of American football from Riverside, California
American football defensive ends
Missouri Tigers football players
Miami Dolphins players
American Conference Pro Bowl players
People from Blythe, California